Bayan-Önjüül (Rich sleepover) is a sum of Töv Province in Mongolia. The Baraat settlement (former Bayan-Baraat sum center) is 30 km SE from Bayan-Önjüül sum center.

Districts of Töv Province